Blues for Myself may refer to:
 Blues for Myself (Cedar Walton album)
 Blues for Myself (Tete Montoliu album)